Baga is a village in Mainling County, in the south-east of the Tibet Autonomous Region of China and is located some  east of Tungdor,  south of Dagzê and  south of Qomo. There are said to be springs in the area, fed by the Kyichu River which flows nearby. The village produces a cheese known as thu.

It is under the administration of Qiangna Township of Mainling County.

References

Populated places in Nyingchi